John Livingstone "Ian" McMillan (born 18 March 1931) is a Scottish former footballer who played for Airdrieonians, Rangers and the Scotland national team.

Playing career
McMillan was born in Airdrie. Nicknamed "The Wee Prime Minister" (he shared a variant of his surname with the incumbent of the era), he started his career with local club Airdrieonians in 1948 where he would go on to become a club legend. He scored 102 goals in 249 league appearances over ten years for the club in this spell, in the role of scheming inside-forward (a creative midfield position in today's football parlance).

McMillan was at Rangers from 1958 until 1964, making 127 league appearances and 200 in all competitions, including the 1961 European Cup Winners' Cup Final. The Gers lost out in that tie to Fiorentina, but his spell was otherwise very successful, featuring four Scottish League titles (1958–59, 1960–61, 1962–63 and 1963–64), three Scottish Cup winner's medals (1960, 1962 and 1963), and two from the Scottish League Cup (1960 and 1961). Despite his prominent role at a major club, he also continued to work in his other profession as a mining surveyor]] as he had done as a part-time player. He studied geology as a student at Edinburgh University.

He returned to Airdrieonians in 1964 where he would remain for a further two years, though affected by injuries.

International
He was capped six times by the Scotland national team between 1952 and 1961, scoring twice – both against the United States in April 1952. McMillan was in Scotland's 22-man 1954 World Cup squad, but the SFA decided to take only 13 of the group to the finals, with McMillan staying at home on reserve with the likes of Bobby Combe and Jimmy Binning (inside forward George Hamilton was also on reserve, but travelled after Bobby Johnstone withdrew through injury).

After playing

McMillan later managed Airdrieonians between 1970 and 1976, taking them to 1975 Scottish Cup Final. He is currently Honorary president of the current Airdrieonians, a club that was formed as 'Airdrie United' after the original Airdrieonians went out of business in 2002.

He is the grandfather of modern-day player, Iain Russell.

Career statistics

International appearances

International goals

Honours
Scottish Football Hall of Fame inductee: 2018

References

External links

International stats at Londonhearts.com

Living people
1931 births
Scottish footballers
Scotland international footballers
Scottish football managers
Airdrieonians F.C. (1878) players
Rangers F.C. players
Airdrieonians F.C. (1878) managers
1954 FIFA World Cup players
Scotland B international footballers
Scottish Football League players
Scottish Football League representative players
Footballers from Airdrie, North Lanarkshire
Association football inside forwards
Scottish Football League managers
Scottish Football Hall of Fame inductees